Jacques Fellice (born 8 February 1955 in Pointe-a-Pitre, Guadeloupe) is a French athlete who specialises in the 4 x 400 meter relay. Fellice competed at the 1980 Summer Olympics and 1984 Summer Olympics.

References 
 

French male sprinters
Olympic athletes of France
French people of Guadeloupean descent
Athletes (track and field) at the 1980 Summer Olympics
Athletes (track and field) at the 1984 Summer Olympics
Athletes (track and field) at the 1979 Mediterranean Games
Mediterranean Games gold medalists for France
Mediterranean Games medalists in athletics
1955 births
Living people
20th-century French people